INS Charag (K97) was a Chamak class missile boat of the Indian Navy.

References

Chamak-class missile boats
Fast attack craft of the Indian Navy
Naval ships of India